Shawn Austin (born January 13, 1996) is a Canadian country singer and songwriter. He is signed to Big Loud Records' joint venture Local Hay.

Early life
Born and raised in Vancouver, British Columbia, Austin elected to pursue a career in country music due to its "wholesomeness and authenticity", naming Garth Brooks as one of his influences. He stated Stevie Ray Vaughan was the reason he began playing the guitar, and that Michael Bublé's melodies are an influence in his music as well.

Career
After debuting as an independent artist, Austin signed with Dallas Smith's label Steelhead Music and released the single "Paradise Found" in 2017. The song peaked at number eight on the Billboard Canada Country chart giving Austin a top ten hit to start his career. He followed it up with the single "Get Me There" in 2018.

Later that year, Austin released "You Belong". The track was the lead single off his debut six-track extended play Shawn Austin, released on September 28, 2018. In 2019, he released the single "What Do I Know", which later peaked at number seven on Canada Country and became a new career high. He followed that up with "The Little Things" in 2020.

In August 2021, Austin signed with Big Loud Records and their Canadian-based imprint Local Hay, a joint venture between the label, Dallas Smith, producer Scott Cooke, and partner Alex Seif. He then released the single "Tailgate to Heaven" featuring American country singer Chris Lane. Austin was an opening act on Dallas Smith's "Some Things Never Change Tour" in the spring and early summer of 2022. In June 2022, he released the extended play Planes Don't Wait, which included "Tailgate to Heaven" and the singles "Get You" and "Slip". In 2023, Austin was an opener for Old Dominion on the Canadian dates of their "No Bad Vibes Tour".

Discography

Extended plays

Singles

Music videos

Awards and nominations

References

External links

Living people
Big Loud artists
Canadian country singer-songwriters
Canadian male singer-songwriters
Musicians from Vancouver
21st-century Canadian male singers
1996 births